Chen Wen-xing (born 10 November 1964) is a Taiwanese sprinter. She competed in the women's 4 × 100 metres relay at the 1988 Summer Olympics.

References

1964 births
Living people
Athletes (track and field) at the 1988 Summer Olympics
Taiwanese female sprinters
Taiwanese female hurdlers
Olympic athletes of Taiwan
Place of birth missing (living people)